Litoporus uncatus is a cellar spider species found in Northern South America.

See also 
 List of Pholcidae species

Spiders of South America
Pholcidae
Spiders described in 1893